Felton Wilson (April 24, 1908 – September 15, 1973) was an American Negro league catcher in the 1930s.

A native of Talladega County, Alabama, Wilson made his Negro leagues debut with the Cleveland Stars in 1932. He played for the Akron Black Tyrites the following season, and finished his career in 1937 with the Detroit Stars. Wilson died in Detroit, Michigan in 1973 at age 65.

References

External links
 and Seamheads

 and Seamheads

1908 births
1973 deaths
Akron Black Tyrites players
Detroit Stars (1937) players
Baseball catchers
Baseball players from Alabama
People from Talladega County, Alabama
20th-century African-American sportspeople